Fanny Lam Christie (born 1952) is a Hong Kong-born artist who specializes in sculpture and works in Scotland. She currently works from her studio in Perthshire, Scotland.

Education 
In 2004, Christie graduated with a Bachelor of Arts with Honours from the Edinburgh College of Art. She previously studied painting in Hong Kong in the 1970s, followed by studies in business administration and art education.

Work 
Christie's work often focuses on the human relationship with nature. University of Stirling, Perth & Kinross Council and the Scottish Sculpture Park hold works by Christie. She works mainly in bronze and clay, and undertakes private and public commissions as well as site-specific artworks. In 2014–2015, Christie undertook a residency at Stirling University's Institute of Aquaculture. As part of the Grassroots Public Art Grant programme run by West Lothian Council, Christie created a work in Armadale in 2010.

Christie is a member of several professional organisations including the Edinburgh Sculpture Workshop, Visual Arts Scotland, Perthshire Visual Arts Forum, Society of Scottish Artists and the Scottish Artists Union. She is also a member of the artist group, Heartwood Artists.

Selected exhibitions and awards 

 NS Macfarlane Charitable Trust award, 2005
CUSP, Macrobert Arts Centre, 2–30 May 2015
 Reflections of the East art and event series, Stirling University, 20 September–23 December 2015
 Fanny Lam Christie, Birnam Arts & Conference Centre, 3–30 September 2016
 Arts Festival , Shankill Castle, County Kilkenny, Ireland, 9–19 August 2018

References

External links 

 Artworks by or after Fanny Lam Christie on Art UK
http://www.scottishsculpturepark.com/artist-profile.php?id=34

1952 births
Living people
20th-century women artists
21st-century women artists
Scottish women sculptors
Hong Kong women artists
Hong Kong artists
Scottish sculptors
Alumni of the Edinburgh College of Art